The Miami metropolitan area (also known as Greater Miami, the Tri-County Area, South Florida, or the Gold Coast) is the ninth-largest metropolitan statistical area in the United States and the 61st-largest metropolitan area in the world with a 2020 population of 6.138 million people.

With  of urban landmass, the Miami metropolitan area also is one of the most populous urban agglomerations in the world. The City of Miami is the financial and cultural core of the metropolis. The metropolitan area includes Miami-Dade, Broward, and Palm Beach Counties, which rank as the first-, second-, and third-most populous counties in Florida. Miami-Dade, with 2,716,940 people in 2019, is the seventh-most populous county in the United States. The metropolitan area's principal cities include Miami, Fort Lauderdale, Pompano Beach, West Palm Beach, Hialeah, Hollywood, Boca Raton, Sunrise, Miami Beach, Deerfield Beach, Pembroke Pines, Kendall, Boynton Beach, Delray Beach, Jupiter, Doral, Palm Beach Gardens, Davie, Miramar, Wellington, Homestead and Coral Gables. The Miami metropolitan area sits within the South Florida region, which includes the Everglades and the Florida Keys.

With an estimated 6,166,488 inhabitants as of 2019, the three counties collectively make up the Miami metropolitan area, which is the most populous in Florida and the second-largest in the Southeastern United States. Greater Miami includes a larger area defined by the United States Census Bureau as the Miami-Port St. Lucie-Fort Lauderdale combined statistical area, which includes Martin, Saint Lucie, and Indian River counties to the north of Palm Beach County.

The Miami metropolitan statistical area is longer than any other urbanized area in the United States except for the New York metropolitan area. It was the eighth most densely populated urbanized area in the United States in the 2000 census.

Miami and Hialeah, the second-largest city in the metropolitan area, had population densities of more than 10,000/sq mi (more than 3,800/km2). The Miami Urbanized Area was the fourth-largest urbanized area in the United States in the 2010 census.

The Miami metropolitan area also includes several urban clusters (UCs) as of the 2000 Census, which are not part of the Miami urbanized area. These are the Belle Glade UC, population 24,218, area 20.717 km2 and population density of 3027.6/sq mi; Key Biscayne UC, population 10,513, area 4.924 km2 and population density of 5529.5/sq mi; Redland UC, population 3,936, area 10.586 km2 and population density of 963.0/sq mi; and West Jupiter UC, population 8,998, area 24.737 km2 and population density of 942.1/sq mi.{{

The most notable colleges and universities in the Miami metropolitan area include Florida Atlantic University, Florida International University, Nova Southeastern University, and the University of Miami, as well as community colleges such as Broward College, Miami Dade College, and Palm Beach State College. Some of these institutions, such as Florida International University and Miami Dade College, make up some of the largest institutions of higher learning in the United States.

Definitions

Miami metropolitan area
The Miami metropolitan area is defined by the U.S. Office of Management and Budget as the Miami-Fort Lauderdale-Pompano Beach Metropolitan Statistical Area (MSA), with a 2019 population of 6,166,488. The MSA is in turn made up of three "metropolitan divisions" :
 Miami-Miami Beach-Kendall, FL Metropolitan Division, coterminous with Miami Dade County (2019 population 2,716,940).
 Fort Lauderdale-Pompano Beach-Sunrise, FL Metropolitan Division, coterminous with Broward County (2019 population 1,952,778).
 West Palm Beach-Boca Raton-Boynton Beach, FL Metropolitan Division, coterminous with Palm Beach County (2019 population 1,496,770).

The MSA is the most populous metropolitan area in the Southeastern United States and has an area of 6,137 sq. mi (15,890 km2).

Miami-Port Saint Lucie-Fort Lauderdale, FL Combined Statistical Area
The Census Bureau also defines a wider commercial region based on commuting patterns, the Miami-Port Saint Lucie-Fort Lauderdale Combined Statistical Area (CSA), with an estimated population of 6,889,936 in 2019.

The CSA consists of three component metropolitan areas:
 The Miami-Fort Lauderdale-West Palm Beach MSA (2019 pop. 6,166,488)
 The Port Saint Lucie, FL MSA (2019 pop. 489,297), consisting of:
 Martin County, Florida (2019 pop. 161,000)
 Saint Lucie County, Florida (2019 pop. 328,297)
 The Sebastian-Vero Beach, FL MSA, coterminous with Indian River County (2019 pop. 159,923)

Gold Coast 
The Miami metropolitan area is frequently named the "Gold Coast" in convention with Florida's other coast regions, including the Space Coast, Treasure Coast, Sun Coast, Nature Coast, Forgotten Coast, Fun Coast, and First Coast. Like several of the others, it seems to have originated at the time the area first saw major growth. One of the best known of Florida's vernacular regions, the name is a reference to the wealth and ritzy tropical lifestyle that characterizes the area.

Climate and geography

Climate
 

South Florida/Miami metropolitan area has a tropical climate, similar to the climate found in much of the Caribbean. It is the only metropolitan area in the 48 contiguous states that falls under that category. More specifically, it generally has a tropical monsoon climate (Köppen climate classification, Am). The South Florida  metropolis sees most of its rain in the summer (wet season) and is quite dry in the winter (dry season). The wet season, which is hot and humid, lasts from May to October, when daily thunderstorms and passing weak tropical lows bring downpours during the late afternoon. The dry season often starts in late October and runs through late April. During the height of the dry season from February through April, South Florida is often very dry, and often brush fires and water restrictions are an issue. At times cold fronts can make it all the way down to South Florida and provide some modest rainfall in the dry season. The hurricane season largely coincides with the wet season.

In addition to its sea-level elevation, coastal location and position near the Tropic of Cancer and the Caribbean, the area owes its warm, humid climate to the Gulf Stream, which moderates climate year-round. A typical summer day does not see temperatures below . Temperatures in the high 80s to low 90s (30–35 °C) accompanied by high humidity are often relieved by afternoon thunderstorms or a sea breeze that develops off the Atlantic Ocean, which then allow lower temperatures, although conditions still remain very muggy.

During winter, dry air often dominates as dew points are often very low. Although daily highs can sometimes reach  even in January and February. Each winter, cold fronts occasionally make their way down to the northern Bahamas and South Florida. When this occurs low temperatures can dip into the 40s during the early morning hours before quickly warming-up toward late morning/early afternoon. It is rare for temperatures to drop below , however, low temperatures at or around  have occurred some years. South Florida only experiences these cold spells about twice each winter and they typically only last a day or two before temperatures return to the mid 70s. On average South Florida is frost-free, although there can be a light frost in the inland communities about once every decade.

Hurricane season officially runs from June 1 through November 30, although hurricanes can develop outside that period. The most likely time for South Florida to be hit is during the peak of the Cape Verde season, mid-August through the end of September. Due to its location between two major bodies of water known for tropical activity, South Florida is also statistically the most likely major area to be struck by a hurricane in the world, trailed closely by Nassau, Bahamas, and Havana, Cuba. Many hurricanes have affected the metropolis, including Betsy in 1965, Andrew in 1992, Irene in 1999, Hurricanes Katrina and Wilma in 2005, and Irma in 2017. In addition, a tropical depression in October 2000 passed over the city, causing record rainfall and flooding. Locally, the storm is credited as the No Name Storm of 2000, though the depression went on to become Tropical Storm Leslie upon entering the Atlantic Ocean.

Component counties, subregions, and cities

Largest cities 

The following is a list of the twenty largest cities in the Miami metropolitan area as ranked by population.

Areas with between 10,000 and 100,000 inhabitants 

 Aventura
 Belle Glade
 Boca Del Mar
 Boynton Beach
 Brownsville
 Coconut Creek
 Cooper City
 Coral Gables
 Coral Terrace
 Country Club
 Country Walk
 Cutler Bay
 Dania Beach
 Deerfield Beach
 Delray Beach
 Doral
 Florida City
 Fontainebleau
 Gladeview
 Glenvar Heights
 Goulds
 Greenacres
 Hallandale Beach
 Hamptons at Boca Raton
 Hialeah Gardens
 Homestead
 Ives Estates
 Jupiter
 Kendale Lakes
 Kendall West
 Kendall
 Key Biscayne
 Kings Point
 Lake Worth Corridor
 Lake Worth Beach
 Lauderdale Lakes
 Lauderhill
 Leisure City
 Lighthouse Point
 Margate
 Miami Beach
 Miami Lakes
 Miami Shores
 Miami Springs
 North Lauderdale
 North Miami Beach
 North Miami
 North Palm Beach
 Oakland Park
 Ojus
 Olympia Heights
 Opa-locka
 Palm Beach Gardens
 Palm Beach
 Palm Springs
 Palmetto Bay
 Palmetto Estates
 Parkland
 Pinecrest
 Pinewood
 Plantation
 Princeton
 Richmond West
 Riviera Beach
 Royal Palm Beach
 Sandalfoot Cove
 South Miami Heights
 South Miami
 Sunny Isles Beach
 Sunrise
 Sunset
 Sweetwater
 Tamarac
 Tamiami
 The Crossings
 The Hammocks
 University Park
 Wellington
 West Little River
 West Park
 Westchester
 Weston
 Westwood Lakes
 Wilton Manors

Areas with fewer than 10,000 inhabitants 

 Atlantis
 Bal Harbour
 Bay Harbor Islands
 Belle Glade Camp
 Biscayne Park
 Boca Pointe
 Boulevard Gardens
 Briny Breezes
 Broadview Park
 Canal Point
 Century Village
 Cypress Lakes
 Dunes Road
 El Portal
 Fisher Island
 Franklin Park
 Fremd Village-Padgett Island
 Glen Ridge
Godfrey Road
 Golden Beach
 Golden Lakes
 Golf
 Gulf Stream
 Gun Club Estates
 Haverhill
 High Point
 Highland Beach
 Hillsboro Beach
 Hillsboro Pines
 Homestead Base
 Hypoluxo
 Indian Creek
 Islandia
 Juno Beach
 Juno Ridge
 Jupiter Inlet Colony
 Lake Belvedere Estates
 Lake Clarke Shores
 Lake Harbor
 Lake Park
 Lakeside Green
 Lantana
 Lauderdale-by-the-Sea
 Lazy Lake
 Limestone Creek
 Manalapan
 Mangonia Park
 Medley
 Mission Bay
 Naranja
 North Bay Village
 Ocean Ridge
 Pahokee
 Palm Beach Shores
 Palm Springs North
 Pembroke Park
 Plantation Mobile Home Park
 Richmond Heights
 Roosevelt Gardens
 Royal Palm Estates
 Schall Circle
 Sea Ranch Lakes
 Seminole Manor
 South Bay
 South Palm Beach
 Southwest Ranches
 Stacy Street
 Surfside
 Tequesta
 Three Lakes
 Villages of Oriole
 Virginia Gardens
 Washington Park
 Westlake
 West Miami
 West Perrine
 Westview
 Whisper Walk

Demographics

Population 

The Miami area is a diverse community with a large proportion of foreign-born residents, in large part due to its close proximity to Latin America and the Caribbean. Another factor is residents who were formerly snowbirds from the Northeast and, to a lesser extent, countries such as Canada.

As of the 2005 American Community Survey,  5,334,685 people lived in the metropolis.

As of 2005, 83% of the people at least one year old living in the Miami metro area were living in the same residence one year earlier; 12% had moved during the past year from another residence in the same county, 2% from another county in the same state, 2% from another state, and 1% from abroad.

As of 2005, 83% of people 25 years and over had at least graduated from high school and 30% had a bachelor's degree or higher. Among people 16 to 19 years old, 7% were dropouts; they were not enrolled in school and had not yet graduated from high school. The total school enrollment in the Miami Metro Area was 1.4 million in 2005. Nursery school and kindergarten enrollment was 170,000 and elementary or high school enrollment was 879,000 children. College or graduate school enrollment was 354,000.

As of 2005, 14% of those in the Miami metropolitan area were in poverty. 19% of related children under 18 were below the poverty level, compared with 14% of people 65 years old and over. 11% of all families, and 26% of families with a female householder and no husband present had incomes below the poverty level.

As of 2005, 63% of greater Miami residents were born in the United States (30% in Florida and 33% elsewhere in the country) and 37% were foreign-born.

Age and gender 
As of the 2010 U.S. census, there were 5,564,635 people of which 2.8 million (52%) were female and 2.6 million (48%) were male. The median age was 38.6 years. 24% of the population were under 18 years and 15% were 65 years and older. There were 2,097,626 households, and 1,378,108 families residing in the Miami metropolitan area.

Ethnicity 
The racial makeup of the population of the Miami area [6,066,387] as of 2016:
 White: 70%
 White Hispanic: 31.1%
 White Non-Hispanic: 39.2%
 Black or African American: 21.1%
 Native American and Alaskan Native: 0.2%
 Asian: 2.6%
 Native Hawaiian and Pacific Islander: 0%
 Other races: 3.4%
 Two or more races: 2.6%
 Hispanic or Latino (of any race) were 46.1% of the population

Language
Among people at least five years old living in the region in 2005, 52% spoke primarily English at home, while 48% spoke some other language. Of those speaking a language other than English at home, 78% spoke Spanish (37% of the total population). Other languages widely spoken in the region include Haitian Creole, French, German, Arabic, Hebrew, Italian, Portuguese, Russian and Yiddish.

There is a strong divide between the northern and southern parts of the region in terms of dominant language. In 2010, English was the household language of 73.1% of Palm Beach County residents and 63.4% of Broward County residents but only 28.1% of Miami-Dade County residents. In contrast, 63.8% of Miami-Dade County residents spoke Spanish at home.

Religion
According to a 2014 study by the Pew Research Center, Christianity is the most prevalent religion in the Miami metropolitan area (68%), with 39% professing attendance at a variety of churches that could be considered Protestant and 27% professing Roman Catholic beliefs. Judaism is second (9%), followed by Islam, Buddhism, Hinduism and a variety of other religions have smaller followings; 21% of the population did not identify with any religion.

The Miami area has one of the largest Jewish communities in the United States. 10.2% of the population identified as Jewish in the 2000 Census. According to a 2011 survey of American Judaism, Palm Beach County had the most Jews of any Florida county both in absolute numbers (205,850) and as a percentage of the overall population (15.8%). Broward County came in second place with 170,700 Jewish reidents or 9.8% of the population, and Miami-Dade County came in third with 106,300 or 4.3%.

County demographics

Housing
Changes in house prices for the area are publicly tracked on a regular basis using the Case–Shiller index; the statistic is published by Standard & Poor's and is also a component of S&P's 10-city composite index of the value of the residential real estate market.

As of 2005, the Miami area had a total of 2.3 million housing units, 13% of which were vacant. Of the total housing units, 52% were in single-unit structures, 45% were in multi-unit structures, and 3% were mobile homes. 25% of the housing units were built since 1990. As of 2019, over 70% of Miami's residents are renters with median rent of $1,355, $180 over the national average.

Households and families: There were 2,338,450 households, The average household size was 2.6 people. Families made up 65% of the households in the Miami area. This figure includes both married-couple families (45%) and other families (20%). Nonfamily households made up 35% of all households in Miami. Most of the nonfamily households were people living alone, but some consisted of people living in households in which no one was related to the householder.

Occupied housing unit characteristics: In 2005, the Miami area had 2.0 million occupied housing units – 1.3 million (66%) owner occupied and 688,000 (34%) renter occupied.

As of 2010, housing costs in the Miami area typically represented 40% of household income, compared to 34% nationwide.

Property tax increase: In March 2009, Miami area lawmakers passed a 5–10% hike in property tax millage rates throughout the metropolitan area to fund the construction of new schools and to fund understaffed schools and educational institutions, resulting in an increase in residents' property tax bills beginning in the 2009 tax year.

Politics

Politically, metropolitan Miami is strongly Democratic, like most large metropolitan regions in the United States. Broward County is the second-most heavily Democratic county in the state, behind only Gadsden County, which is much smaller. This contrasts with most of the rest of Florida, whose heavier Southern influence and high population of elderly voters makes it a swing or Republican-leaning state. Miami-Dade County has a relatively high percentage of Republican voters for an urban county, due partially to its Cuban-American population, which leans Republican as a result of its anti-communist views, but Miami-Dade County still remains very Democratic when compared with most of Florida's other counties. Despite being more suburban and affulent, Palm Beach County is reliably Democratic as well and in the 2020 presidential election voted for Democratic candidate Joe Biden by a higher margin than Miami-Dade County did.

In the 2016 presidential election, 62.3% of voters in the Miami metropolitan area voted Democratic. This was the 6th highest of any metro area in the United States. However, in recent years the area has shifted hard to the Republicans, with former president Donald Trump losing the metro area by 16 points in 2020 compared to losing it by 30 in 2016 (Fueled especially by Miami Dade County shifting 22 points to the right between 2016 and 2020), and Governor Ron DeSantis winning the metro area outright in the 2022 gubernatorial election, winning both Miami Dade and Palm Beach Counties (With the former being won by double digits) while losing Broward only by less than 16 points. This may be attributed in part to a broader rightward shift among Hispanic voters in these years.

Government
The metropolitan area is governed by 3 counties. In total there are 107 municipalities or incorporated places in the metropolis. Each one of the municipalities has its own city, town or village government, although there is no distinction between the 3 names. Much of the land in the metropolis is unincorporated, which means it does not belong to any municipality, and  therefore is governed directly by the county it is located in.

Congressional districts
(the 113th Congress), the Cook Partisan Voting Index listed four as being Republican-leaning: the 18th, 25th, 26th, and 27th, with the 25th being the most Republican-leaning at R+5, and five as being Democratic-leaning: the 20th, 21st, 22nd, 23rd, and 24th, with the 24th being the most Democratic-leaning at D+34, making it the ninth-most Democratic-leaning district in the nation.

Economy

Among those employed in the Miami metropolitan area, 32% were management, professional, and related occupations, 30% were sales and office occupations, 18% were service occupations, 11% were construction, extraction, maintenance and repair occupations, and 9% were production, transportation, and material moving occupations. 81% of the people employed were Private wage and salary workers; 12% were Federal, state, or local government workers; and 7% were self-employed.

The median income of households in the Miami area was $43,091. 78% of the households received earnings and 13% received retirement income other than Social Security. 30% of the households received Social Security. The average income from Social Security was $13. These income sources are not mutually exclusive; that is, some households received income from more than one source.

In 2005, for the employed population 16 years and older, the leading industries in the Miami area were educational services, health care, and social assistance, which accounted for 18%, and Professional, scientific, and management, and administrative and waste management services, which accounted for 13% of the population. 79% of Miami area workers drove to work alone in 2005, 10% carpooled, 4% took public transportation, and 4% used other means. The remaining 3% worked at home. Among those who commuted to work, it took them on average 28.5 minutes to get to work.

Culture

Miami dialect 

In  Miami-Dade County a unique dialect, commonly called the Miami dialect, is widely spoken. The dialect developed among second- or third-generation Hispanics, including Cuban-Americans, whose first language was English, though some non-Hispanic white, black, and other races who were born and raised in Miami-Dade tend to adopt it as well. It is based on a fairly standard American accent but with some changes very similar to dialects in the Mid-Atlantic, especially the New York area dialect, Northern New Jersey English, and New York Latino English. Unlike Virginia Piedmont, Coastal Southern American, and Northeast American dialects and Florida Cracker dialect of the Miami accent is rhotic; it also incorporates a rhythm and pronunciation heavily influenced by Spanish in which rhythm is syllable-timed.

It is possible to differentiate the Miami accent from a variety of interlanguages spoken by second-language speakers.

The Miami accent is much less common in Broward County and Palm Beach County, where the majority of the population is non-Hispanic.

Area codes

 305: Miami-Dade County and the Florida Keys; overlaid by 786
 786: Miami-Dade County and the Florida Keys; overlays 305
 954: All of Broward County: Fort Lauderdale, Hollywood, Coral Springs, Pompano Beach, overlaid by 754
 754: All of Broward County: Fort Lauderdale, Hollywood, Coral Springs, Pompano Beach, overlays with 954
 561: All of Palm Beach County: West Palm Beach, Boca Raton, Boynton Beach, Delray Beach, will be overlaid by 728
 728: All of Palm Beach County: West Palm Beach, Boca Raton, Boynton Beach, Delray Beach, will overlay with 561

Media 

Greater Miami is served by several English-language and two major Spanish-language daily newspapers. The Miami Herald, headquartered in Doral, is Miami's primary newspaper with over a million readers. It also has news bureaus in Broward County, Monroe County, and Nassau, Bahamas. The South Florida Sun-Sentinel circulates primarily in Broward and southern Palm Beach counties and also has a news bureau in Havana, Cuba. The Palm Beach Post serves mainly Palm Beach County, especially the central and northern regions, and the Treasure Coast. The Boca Raton News publishes five days a week and circulates in southern Palm Beach County. El Nuevo Herald, a subsidiary of the Miami Herald, and Diario Las Americas, are Spanish-language daily papers that circulate mainly in Miami-Dade County. La Palma and El Sentinel are weekly Spanish newspapers published by the Palm Beach Post and Sun-Sentinel, respectively, and circulate in the same areas as their English-language counterparts.

There are several university student-run newspapers in the area, including The Miami Hurricane at the University of Miami, University Press at Florida Atlantic University, PantherNOW at Florida International University, and The Current at Nova Southeastern University.

Greater Miami is split into two separate television/radio markets: The Miami-Fort Lauderdale market serves Miami-Dade, Broward and the Florida Keys. The West Palm Beach market serves Palm Beach County and the Treasure Coast region.

Miami-Fort Lauderdale is the 12th largest radio market and the 16th-largest television market in the U.S. television stations serving the Miami-Fort Lauderdale area include WAMI-TV (UniMas), WBFS-TV (MyNetworkTV), WSFL-TV (The CW), WFOR-TV (CBS), WHFT-TV (TBN), WLTV (Univision), WPLG (ABC), WPXM (ION), WSCV (Telemundo), WSVN (FOX), WTVJ (NBC), WLRN-TV (PBS), and WPBT (also PBS), the latter television station being the only channel to serve the entire metropolitan area.

In addition to the Miami-Fort Lauderdale market, West Palm Beach has its own. It is the 49th largest radio market and the 38th-largest television market in the U.S.  Television stations serving the West Palm Beach area include WPTV (NBC), WPEC (CBS), WPBF (ABC),  WFLX (FOX), WTVX (The CW), WXEL (PBS), WTCN (MyNetworkTV), and  WPXP (ION).  The West Palm Beach market shares use of WSCV and WLTV for Telemundo and Univision respectively.   Also, both markets cross over and tend to be available interchangeably between both areas.  In 2015, WPBT and WXEL merged their operations, to form South Florida PBS, although both stations have maintained separate programming schedules and social media platforms, but share the same subchannel lineup.

Education 

In Florida, each county is also a school district. Each district is headed by an elected school board. A professional superintendent manages the day-to-day operations of each district, who is appointed by and serves at the pleasure of the school board.

The Miami-Dade County Public School District is currently the 4th-largest public school district in the nation. The School District of Palm Beach County is the 4th-largest in Florida and the 11th-largest in the United States. Broward County Public School District is the 6th-largest in the United States.

The University of Miami is the one of the top-ranked research institutions in the United States, and is the most selective major university in Florida.

, Florida International University is ranked the 4th largest university by enrollment in the United States.

Some colleges and universities in Greater Miami include:
 Barry University (private/Catholic)
 Broward College (public)
 Carlos Albizu University (private)
 Chamberlain University (private)
 Florida Atlantic University (public)
 Florida International University (public)
 Florida Memorial University (private/Baptist)
 Florida National University (private)
 Jersey College (private)
 Keiser University (private)
 Lynn University (private)
 Miami Dade College (public)
 Northwood University (private)
 Nova Southeastern University (private)
 Palm Beach Atlantic University (private/Christian)
 Palm Beach State College (public)
 St. Thomas University (private/Catholic)
 University of Miami (private)

In 2005, 82% of people 25 years and over had at least graduated from high school and 28% had a bachelor's degree or higher. Among people 16 to 19 years old, 7% were dropouts; they were not enrolled in school and had not graduated from high school. The total school enrollment in the Miami metro area was 1.4 million in 2005. Nursery school and kindergarten enrollment was 170,000 and elementary or high school enrollment was 879,000. College or graduate school enrollment was 354,000.

Transportation

Roads 

The Miami metropolitan area is served by five interstate highways operated by the Florida Department of Transportation (FDOT) in conjunction with local agencies. Interstate 95 (I-95) runs north to south along the coast, ending just south of Downtown Miami at South Dixie Highway (US 1). I-75 runs east to west, turning south in western Broward County and connecting suburban north Miami-Dade to Naples on the Southwest Coast via Alligator Alley, which transverses the Florida Everglades before turning north. I-595 connects the Broward coast and Downtown Fort Lauderdale to I-75 and Alligator Alley. In Miami, I-195 and I-395 relay the main I-95 route east to Biscayne Boulevard (US 1) and Miami Beach across Biscayne Bay via the Julia Tuttle and MacArthur causeways.

In greater Miami, the Miami-Dade Expressway Authority and Florida's Turnpike Enterprise (FTE) maintain eight state expressways in conjunction with FDOT. The Airport Expressway (SR 112) and the Dolphin Expressway (SR 836) relay western Miami-Dade suburbs to the eastern urban coast at I-95, and to Miami Beach via  I-195 and I-395 at the Airport and Midtown interchanges. The Gratigny Parkway (SR 924) connects northern Miami suburbs to the southern end of I-75. The Palmetto Expressway (SR 826) is the primary beltway road of urban Miami, relaying I-95 and Florida's Turnpike (SR 91) at the Golden Glades Interchange near northeastern North Miami Beach to the southern inland suburbs of Kendall and Pinecrest. The Don Shula Expressway (SR 874) and the Homestead Extension of Florida's Turnpike (SR 821) form the southernmost end of the beltway, connecting the Palmetto Expressway to the bedroom communities of Homestead and Florida City. The Snapper Creek Expressway (SR 878) relays the Don Shula Expressway to South Dixie Highway (US 1).

The urban bypass expressway in greater Fort Lauderdale is the Sawgrass Expressway (SR 869), connecting the northern Broward County coast at I-95 and Deerfield Beach to I-595 and I-75 at Alligator Alley in Sunrise.

Express lanes on I-95 start in Miami-Dade County and continue into Broward County. With an increased presence of traffic in South Florida, it is projected that express lanes will soon be implemented in southern Palm Beach County.

Major freeways and tollways 
  Interstate 95
  Interstate 75
  Interstate 195 /  State Road 112 (Airport Expressway)
  Interstate 395 /  State Road 836 (Dolphin Expressway)
  Interstate 595 (Port Everglades Expressway)
  Florida's Turnpike, including Homestead Extension
  State Road 924 (Gratigny Parkway)
  State Road 874 (Don Shula Expressway)
  State Road 878 (Snapper Creek Expressway)
  State Road 869 (Sawgrass Expressway)
  State Road 826 (Palmetto Expressway)

Major airports 
The metropolitan area is served by three major commercial airports. These airports combine to make the fourth largest domestic origin and destination market in the United States, after New York City, Los Angeles, and Chicago.

The following smaller general aviation airports are also in the metro area:

Seaports 

The metropolis also has four seaports, the largest and most important being the Port of Miami. Others in the area include Port Everglades, Port of Palm Beach and the Miami River Port.  On August 21, 2012, PortMiami and the U.S. Army Corps of Engineers signed the Partnership Agreement (PPA) construction agreement that will allow the Deep Dredge project to go out for bid.  The Deep Dredge will deepen the Port's existing channels to minus 50/52 feet to prepare for the Panama Canal expansion, now scheduled for completion in early 2015.  PortMiami's deeper channel will provide ships with an economically efficient, reliable and safe navigational route into the Port. PortMiami will be the only U.S. Port south of Norfolk, Virginia to be at the minus 50 foot depth in sync with the opening of the expanded Canal. Deep Dredge is expected to create more than 30,000 direct, indirect, and induced jobs in Florida and allow the Port to meet its goal to double its cargo traffic over the next decade.

Public transportation 
Miami-Dade Transit (MDT) is the largest public transit agency in Florida, operating rapid transit, people movers, and an intercity bus system. Metrorail is Florida's only rapid transit, currently with 23 stations on a  track. The Downtown Miami people mover, Metromover, operates 20 stations and three lines on a  track through the Downtown neighborhoods of the Arts & Entertainment District, the Central Business District, and Brickell. Metrobus serves the entirety of Miami-Dade County, also serving Monroe County as far south as Marathon, and Broward County as far north as Downtown Fort Lauderdale. In Broward County, Broward County Transit runs public buses, as does Palm Tran in Palm Beach County. Additionally, the South Florida Regional Transportation Authority operates Tri-Rail, a commuter rail train that connects the three of the primary cities of South Florida (Miami, Fort Lauderdale, and West Palm Beach), and most intermediate points. Brightline provides service to Miami, Aventura, West Palm Beach, Fort Lauderdale, Boca Raton, and Central Florida's Orlando, with talks to expand to Tampa and Jacksonville.

Sports

Professional
The Miami metro area is home to five major league professional sports teams:
 The Miami Dolphins of the National Football League play at Hard Rock Stadium in Miami Gardens
 The Inter Miami CF of Major League Soccer play at Inter Miami CF Stadium in Fort Lauderdale
 The Miami Heat of the National Basketball Association play at Miami-Dade Arena in Downtown Miami
 The Miami Marlins of Major League Baseball play at Marlins Park in Little Havana
 The Florida Panthers of the National Hockey League play at BB&T Center in Sunrise

College sports
The most prominent college sports program in the Miami metropolitan area are the Miami Hurricanes of the University of Miami in Coral Gables, who compete in Division I of the National Collegiate Athletic Association, the highest level of collegiate athletics. The University of Miami's football team has won five national championships since 1983 and its baseball team has won four national championships since 1982.

Other collegiate sports programs in the metropolitan area include the Florida Atlantic Owls of Florida Atlantic University in Boca Raton, the FIU Panthers of Florida International University in University Park, the Nova Southeastern Sharks of Nova Southeastern University in Davie, and the Barry Buccaneers of Barry University in Miami Shores.

Minor league and other sports
The Miami area is also host to minor league sports teams, including:
 The Miami Marlins and St. Louis Cardinals conduct spring training in Jupiter at Roger Dean Stadium.
The Houston Astros and Washington Nationals conduct spring training in West Palm Beach at The Ballpark of the Palm Beaches.
Inter Miami CF will have a reserve team that will play in USL League One.
 The Homestead-Miami Speedway oval has hosted NASCAR Cup Series and IndyCar Series events. Temporary street circuits at Museum Park hosted several CART, IMSA GT, and American Le Mans Series races between from 1986-1995, as well as a Formula E race in 2015. The Palm Beach International Raceway is a minor road course.

See also 
 South Florida
 United States metropolitan area
 Table of United States Metropolitan Statistical Areas
 Largest metropolitan areas in the Americas

Notes

References

External links 

 Populations of Metropolitan and Micropolitan Area (and rankings)

 
Broward County, Florida
Metropolitan areas of Florida
Miami-Dade County, Florida
Palm Beach County, Florida
South Florida